Prince Mikhail Semyonovich Vorontsov (tr.) was a Russian nobleman and field-marshal, renowned for his success in the Napoleonic wars and most famous for his participation in the Caucasian War from 1844 to 1853.

Life
The son of Count Semyon Vorontsov and nephew of the imperial chancellor Alexander Vorontsov, he was born on 30 May 1782, in Saint Petersburg.
He spent his childhood and youth with his father in London, where his father was ambassador.<ref>[https://books.google.com/books?id=qzkEAAAAYAAJ&q=Mikhail+Semyonovich+Vorontsov+london 'The Encyclopædia Britannica: A Dictionary of Arts, Sciences, Literature and General Information] Vol. 28 At the University Press, 1911 (original from the University of Virginia) page 2013</ref> During 1803–1804 he served in the Caucasus under Pavel Tsitsianov and Gulyakov. From 1805 to 1807, he served in the Napoleonic wars, and was present at the battles of Pułtusk and Friedland. From 1809 to 1811 he participated in the Russo-Turkish War.

He commanded the composite grenadiers division in Prince Petr Bagration's Second Western Army during Napoleon's invasion of Russia in 1812. At the battle of Borodino, his division was in the front line and was attacked by three French divisions under Marshal Davout. Of the 4,000 men in his division, only 300 survived the battle. Vorontsov was wounded but recovered to rejoin the army in 1813. He commanded a new grenadiers division and fought at the battle of Dennewitz and the battle of Leipzig. He was the commander of the corps of occupation in France from 1815 to 1818.

On 7 May 1823 he was appointed governor-general of New Russia, as the southern provinces of the empire were then called, and namestnik of Bessarabia.
In the year of the start of the Russo-Turkish War of 1828–1829, Vorontsov succeeded the wounded Menshikov as commander of the forces besieging Varna, which he captured on 28 September 1828. It was through his energetic efforts that the plague, which had broken out in Turkey, did not penetrate into Russia.

His Polish wife, née Countess Branicka, had a liaison with Alexander Pushkin during her stay in Odessa, which resulted in some of the finest poems in the Russian language.

In 1844, Vorontsov was appointed commander-in-chief and viceroy of the Caucasus. For military details see Murid War. At the battle of Dargo (1845), he was nearly defeated and barely fought his way out of the Chechen forest.  By 1848 he had captured two-thirds of Dagestan, and the situation of the Russians in the Caucasus, so long almost desperate, was steadily improving. For his campaign against Shamil, and for his difficult march through the dangerous forests of Ichkeria, he was raised to the dignity of prince, with the title of Serene Highness. In the beginning of 1853, Vorontsov was allowed to retire because of his increasing infirmities. He was made a field-marshal in 1856, and died the same year at Odessa. His archives were published, in 40 volumes, by Pyotr Bartenev between 1870 and 1897.

A statue of Prince Vorontsov was unveiled in Odessa in 1863. In front of the monument stands the Transfiguration Cathedral with the marble tombs of Prince Vorontsov and his wife. After the Soviets demolished the cathedral in 1936, Vorontsov's remains were secretly reburied in a local cemetery. The cathedral was rebuilt in the early 2000s. The remains of Vorontsov and his wife were solemnly transferred to the church in 2005.

Notes

References

Gammer, Moshe. Muslim Resistance to the Tsar: Shamil and the Conquest of Chechnia and Daghestan''. Frank Cass & Co., London, 1994. .

External links
Online museum of the Vorontsov Family
Mikeshin, Mikhail. "Mikhail Vorontsov: A Metaphysical Portrait in the Landscape".

Field marshals of Russia
Governors-General of Novorossiya
Viceroys in Moldova
1782 births
1856 deaths
Russian military personnel of the Caucasian War
Caucasus Viceroyalty (1801–1917)
1840s in Georgia (country)
Russian commanders of the Napoleonic Wars
Members of the State Council (Russian Empire)
Military personnel from Saint Petersburg
Honorary Knights Grand Cross of the Order of the Bath
Recipients of the Order of St. George of the Second Degree
Recipients of the Order of St. George of the Third Degree
Mikhail Semyonovich
People of the Caucasian War